James Woodgate (born 29 May 2002) is a British archer. He competed in the men's individual event at the 2020 Summer Olympics.

He was educated at Halliford School, Shepperton, and has gone on to study at the University of Warwick.

References

External links
 

2002 births
Living people
British male archers
Olympic archers of Great Britain
Archers at the 2020 Summer Olympics
People from Shepperton